The 1987 Libertarian National Convention was held at the Sheraton Hotel in Seattle, Washington, from September 4 to September 6, 1987. Ron Paul of Texas was chosen as the Libertarian Party's nominee for president in the 1988 election.

Libertarians hold a National Convention every two years to vote on party bylaws, platform and resolutions and elect national party officers and a judicial committee. Every four years it nominates presidential and vice presidential candidates.

Voting for presidential nomination

First ballot
Ron Paul was elected on the first ballot, gathering a majority of the voting delegates, securing nomination.

Voting for vice presidential nomination
A separate vote was held for the vice presidential nomination. Andre Marrou of Alaska was nominated without opposition.

See also
 1988 Democratic National Convention
 1988 Republican National Convention
 1988 United States presidential election
 U.S. presidential nomination convention
 Ron Paul presidential campaign, 1988

References

Libertarian Party (United States) National Conventions
1988 United States presidential election
Libertarian National Convention
1980s in Seattle
Political conventions in Washington (state)
1987 conferences
Libertarian National Convention